Sasa Golob (born , Ljubljana) is a Slovenian female artistic gymnast and part of the national team.  

She participated at the 2012 Summer Olympics in London, United Kingdom, and the 2011 World Artistic Gymnastics Championships.

References

External links

1991 births
Living people
Slovenian female artistic gymnasts
Gymnasts at the 2012 Summer Olympics
Olympic gymnasts of Slovenia
Gymnasts at the 2015 European Games
European Games competitors for Slovenia

People from Ljubljana
21st-century Slovenian women